Så lunka vi så småningom (So we gradually amble) is a song from the Swedish poet and performer Carl Michael Bellman's 1791 collection, Fredman's Songs, where it is No. 21. The song, written a few months after the death of his son Eli, is addressed to his hosts at a meal. It makes light of death, while presenting it to each person individually, of high or low rank in society. The refrain sings of a pair of gravediggers discussing whether the grave is too deep, taking repeated swigs from a bottle of brandy.

Bellman's biographer Lars Lönnroth writes that Bellman takes an existential look at life in the song, comparing the tone to the monologue in Hamlet where the prince laments, holding Yorick's skull in his hands, though this does not prevent Bellman from describing the usual drinking and gallows humour. The musicologist Richard Engländer calls the song especially interesting for its use of a march from a key moment in Naumann's opera Gustaf Wasa: the King's nocturnal monologue in his tent, where he debates whether to capitulate or to fight. The melody's military associations are reworked into a song of contempt for death.

Context

Song

Melody and verse form 

The song is in  time and is marked Marche. It has 8 verses, each of 8 lines, with a 4-line chorus repeated after every verse. The rhyming pattern of each verse is the alternating ABAB-CDCD, while the chorus has the pattern EEFF.

The melody is found in Johann Gottlieb Naumann's 1786 opera (with Johan Henric Kellgren's libretto) , but it is not certain whether Bellman took it from there directly or via another source.

Lyrics 

The song is headed "Under måltiden, varvid han ställer döden under gästernas ögon" ("During a meal, in which he places death under the eyes of the guests"). It is a table-song, addressed to a host and hostess. Bellman wrote it between Christmas and New Year in December 1787, some months after the death of his son Eli. The song makes light of death, urging youths to "heed my word, and take the prettiest Nymph who smiles at you under your arm". The chorus runs "Do you think the grave is too deep? Well, take a swig, take another, ditto two, ditto three, so you'll die happier."

Reception

Bellman's biographer Lars Lönnroth writes that Bellman takes an existential look at life in the song, comparing the tone to the monologue in Hamlet Act 5, scene 1 where the prince laments, holding Yorick's skull in his hands. All the same, he writes, Bellman still turns in the end "to his usual role as the drinking-companion full of gallows humour". The song has been recorded by the Bellman interpreters Fred Åkerström and Sven-Bertil Taube.

The musicologist Richard Engländer calls the song "a specially interesting case". In common with Fredman's Song no. 9, "Måltidssång" ("Mealtime Song") is its setting, at table, and its use of a marching melody from Naumann's Gustaf Wasa. He notes that the melody of song 21 is from a key moment in the opera: Act II, scene 6, Gustaf Wasa's nocturnal monologue in his tent, where he debates whether to capitulate, since the Danes have his mother as a hostage, and sacrifice his mother, or to continue to fight? Bellman, he writes, transforms the robust military associations of the melody into a "a cynical song of contempt for death in soldierly tone". Anyone, Engländer states, who had seen the opera, and who knew Bellman's song with its rhythmic variation in the refrain, would feel the song's clear and grim association with the scene.

References

Sources

 
 
 
 
  (with facsimiles of sheet music from first editions in 1790, 1791)
  (contains the most popular Epistles and Songs, in Swedish, with sheet music)

External links 

 Text of Song 21
 Then off we’ll lumber, every one by John Irons

1791 compositions
Swedish songs
Fredmans sånger